Daniel Sachs Goldman (born February 26, 1976) is an American attorney and politician who is the member of the U.S. House of Representatives from New York's 10th congressional district. He previously served as lead majority counsel in the first impeachment inquiry against Donald Trump and lead counsel to House Managers in Trump's subsequent impeachment trial. Goldman is among the wealthiest members of Congress, with an estimated personal net worth of up to $253 million according to financial disclosure forms.

Early life and family
Goldman was born in Washington, D.C., to Susan and Richard W. Goldman. His father was a federal prosecutor in Washington, D.C. who died when Goldman was a child. His paternal grandparents were Rhoda Haas Goldman and Richard Goldman; his great-grandfather was Walter A. Haas, president of Levi Strauss & Co.; and his great-great-grandfather was Abraham Haas, the founder of the Smart & Final chain of food stores. He was raised in a Conservative Jewish family with his brother, Bill Goldman, who died at age 38 in a plane crash, and sister, Alice Reiter. He is an heir to the Levi Strauss & Co. fortune.

Goldman attended Sidwell Friends School in Washington, where his mother previously served as chair of the board. He graduated with a Bachelor of Arts degree in history from Yale University in 1998 and a Juris Doctor degree with distinction from Stanford Law School in 2005. Before law school, he was an Olympics researcher and a writer for NBC Sports.

Early career

Federal prosecutor and legal analyst

After graduating from law school, Goldman clerked for Charles Breyer of the United States District Court for the Northern District of California and Robert D. Sack of the United States Court of Appeals for the Second Circuit. From 2007 to 2017, Goldman was an Assistant United States Attorney in the Southern District of New York under Preet Bharara. He prosecuted Russian organized crime, Genovese crime family mobsters, including Fotios Geas, who murdered Whitey Bulger while in prison, and a variety of white-collar crime and securities fraud. In 2017, Goldman was the lead prosecutor of Billy Walters, a sports bettor who was convicted for insider trading. After leaving the Southern District, Goldman became a legal analyst for NBC News and MSNBC and a fellow at the Brennan Center for Justice in New York.

Goldman was hired as Senior Advisor and Director of Investigations for the House Intelligence Committee in February 2019 and later became lead counsel for the first impeachment inquiry against Donald Trump. He questioned witnesses on behalf of the majority during the House Intelligence Committee's public hearings. On December 9, 2019, he provided testimony at the public hearing of the House Judiciary Committee.

On November 16, 2021, Goldman announced his candidacy for the Democratic nomination for attorney general of New York in the 2022 election. When incumbent Letitia James ended her campaign for governor in December and opted to run for reelection, Goldman withdrew and endorsed James.

U.S. House of Representatives

Election 

On June 1, 2022, Goldman announced his candidacy for United States Congress in New York's 10th district. A July 14 poll by Data for Progress indicated Goldman had 12% of support, behind Councilwoman Carlina Rivera's 17% and Assemblywoman Yuh-Line Niou's 14% in the crowded Democratic primary, which also included incumbent congressman Mondaire Jones and former congresswoman Elizabeth Holtzman. An internal poll conducted between July 22 and 26 showed Goldman leading the race with 18% of support, followed by Niou with 16% and Rivera with 14%. Goldman has been endorsed by New York State Assemblymember Robert Carroll and Brian A. Cunningham, former U.S. Representative Steve Israel, former Lieutenant Governor of New York Richard Ravitch and The New York Times. He received a backhanded endorsement from Donald Trump, who called him "very compassionate and compromising to those within the Republican Party", which Goldman's campaign rejected as a "pathetic attempt at fooling Democrats".

Goldman's campaign quickly raised more than $200,000 from immediate and extended family members shortly after announcing his candidacy for Congress. His family also contributed more than $600,000 in 2021 when he ran for the Democratic nomination for New York attorney general. He received maximum allowable campaign contributions from billionaire real estate developers Douglas Durst and Stephen M. Ross. Ross was also a major fundraiser and supporter of Trump. As of August 17, Goldman had contributed more than $4 million to his campaign, leading rivals to accuse him of attempting to "purchase this congressional seat".

Goldman's campaign hired a Republican campaign consultant who supported Trump in the 2020 presidential election and called Representative Maxine Waters "retarded" over her support for Trump's impeachment to perform voter outreach to Orthodox Jewish voters in Borough Park, Brooklyn. His campaign immediately fired the consultant and clarified that they were "unaware of these grossly offensive remarks" when City & State contacted them for comment.

Goldman's financial disclosures indicate he has a line of credit from Goldman Sachs worth up to $50 million in addition to investments in weapons manufacturer Sturm, Ruger & Co., defense contractors Lockheed Martin and Northrop Grumman, oil companies Chevron, Exxon Mobil, and Halliburton, and Rupert Murdoch's Fox Corporation & News Corp. Goldman's campaign said he will put his assets into a blind trust if elected and that he is no longer invested in Sturm, Ruger & Co.

Goldman narrowly won the Democratic nomination in the crowded primary, receiving 16,686 votes (25.8%). He won the general election against Republican nominee Benine Hamdan with 83.9% of the vote.

Tenure 
On January 10, 2023, Goldman and Representative Ritchie Torres delivered an ethics complaint to the office of Representative George Santos, who is embattled by revelations that he lied about most of his résumé and background.

Political positions

Abortions
Goldman has said he believes abortion is a healthcare decision that "should be made between an individual and their doctor." He drew significant backlash and criticism when he revealed support for abortion restrictions and said he would not object to a state law barring abortion after a fetus is considered viable. He later said that his personal views on abortion are secondary to the right of a woman to choose.

Economic issues
Goldman supports increasing the national minimum wage, universal child care, and paid family leave. He supports promoting business development and requiring corporations to pay their fair share to "increase opportunity for all Americans."

Environment
Goldman supports the principles and goals of a Green New Deal to transition to clean energy and has called climate change an "existential threat". He supports public–private partnerships to incentivize private companies to invest in renewable energy.

Foreign policy
Goldman supports Israel's continued security and prosperity, as well as a two-state solution that enables the peaceful coexistence of an independent Palestine and Israel. He opposes the Israeli occupation of the West Bank. He opposes the Boycott, Divestment and Sanctions movement, calling it a "thinly-veiled demonstration of antisemitism."

Goldman believes Russia's invasion of Ukraine threatens Ukraine's sovereignty, international order, and democracy globally. He is in favor of U.S. aid to Ukraine and sanctions on Russia.

Goldman supports democracy in Taiwan, but opposed Speaker Nancy Pelosi's August 2022 visit to Taiwan and concurred with the Biden Administration's assessment of the risks, citing intelligence and diplomatic concerns.

Healthcare
Goldman believes healthcare is a fundamental right and supports a public option and private health insurance. He opposes single-payer healthcare, calling the system "unrealistic".

Housing
Goldman supports "public–private partnerships" to combat New York City's lack of affordable housing. He supports construction by private real estate developers, fully funding NYCHA, and allocating federal dollars for private firms to update and manage properties NYCHA owns.

Judiciary
Goldman opposes expanding the Supreme Court of the United States and said it is "antidemocratic" during a candidate forum. He expressed support for implementing term limits on Supreme Court Justices in an interview with New York Magazine.

LGBTQ equality
Goldman supports passing the Equality Act to prohibit discrimination on the basis of sex, sexual orientation and gender identity.

Goldman said he had never marched in an LGBTQ Pride parade until 2022, claiming his work as a federal prosecutor prevented him from doing so, in response to a questionnaire from the Jim Owles Liberal Democratic Club. He drew criticisms and accusations of using the LGBTQ community as a "political football" when it was revealed his explanation contradicted the guidelines and restrictions issued by the Department of Justice, which states employees may "attend political rallies and meetings." In fact, the Department of Justice has its own employee-run "DOJ Pride."

Syria
In 2023, Goldman voted against H.Con.Res. 21 which directed President Joe Biden to remove U.S. troops from Syria within 180 days.

Electoral history

2022

Personal life
Goldman has married twice. In 2002, he married Canadian Olympic diver and lawyer Anne Montminy; they divorced in 2008 after having two children. In 2013, he married Corinne Levy. They have had three children. 

On March 15, 2020, Goldman announced that he had tested positive for COVID-19. From the beginning of the pandemic until August 2020, he stayed in his second home in Water Mill, Southampton.

See also
Timeline of investigations into Trump and Russia (2019–2020)
Steve Castor

Notes

References

External links

 Congressman Dan Goldman official U.S. House website
Dan Goldman for Congress campaign website

|-

1976 births
21st-century American lawyers
American Jews from New York (state)
American people of German-Jewish descent
Assistant United States Attorneys
Democratic Party members of the United States House of Representatives from New York (state)
Haas family
Jewish American attorneys
Jewish members of the United States House of Representatives
Jewish American people in New York (state) politics
Lawyers from New York City
Lawyers from Washington, D.C.
Living people
NBC News people
New York (state) Democrats
Sidwell Friends School alumni
Stanford Law School alumni
Yale College alumni